The Embassy of the Kingdom of Norway in Astana is the chief diplomatic mission of Norway to Kazakhstan, Kyrgyzstan, Tajikistan and Turkmenistan. It is co-located with the Finnish and Swedish embassies on the 17th floor of Astana Tower Business Center in the Samal Microdistrict of Astana.

Establishment 
The Embassy was officially opened by HRH Crown Prince of Norway Haakon Magnus on 5 February 2010. Dag Malmer Halvorsen was appointed the first Norwegian ambassador to Kazakhstan, preceded by Ole Johan Bjørnøy in August 2012.

Visa issuance 
The Embassy issues Schengen visas for Norway, Finland and Iceland. It is mandatory for visa applicants to apply online through Application Portal Norway. In Kyrgyzstan, Tajikistan and Turkmenistan, visas to Norway are issued by the respective German embassies.

Honorary Consulates 
Norway has an Honorary Consulate General in Bishkek, Kyrgyzstan. The Honorary Consulate reports to the Embassy.

See also 
List of diplomatic missions in Kazakhstan

References

External links 
 Norway - official website in Kazakhstan
 Norway’s official websites abroad
 Norwegian Ministry of Foreign Affairs

Norway
Astana
Kazakhstan–Norway relations
Kyrgyzstan–Norway relations
Norway–Turkmenistan relations
Buildings and structures in Astana